General elections were held in Gibraltar on 16 January 1992. They were won by the Gibraltar Socialist Labour Party led by Joe Bossano, whose candidates took 73.1% of the popular vote and eight of the 15 contested seats, retaining control of the Gibraltar House of Assembly.

Results

By candidate
The first fifteen candidates were elected to the House of Assembly.

References

Election and referendum articles with incomplete results
General elections in Gibraltar
Gibraltar
General
Gibraltar